"I'm Still in Love with You" is a song originally recorded by Al Green. Released from the album of the same title, the single spent two weeks at #1 on the Hot Soul Singles chart in August 1972.  It also peaked at #3 on the Billboard Hot 100 singles chart that same year. It would eventually sell over one million copies and is considered one of his most popular songs. Billboard ranked it as the No. 59 song for 1972.

Chart positions

Cover versions
Meli'sa Morgan recorded a version of this song, titled "Still in Love with You", for her 1992 album of the same title. It peaked at #9 on the Hot Black Singles chart and #3 on the Hot Dance Club Play chart.
Al B. Sure! covered the song for the soundtrack to the 1994 basketball film Above the Rim.
Seal recorded a cover of this song for his 2008 album Soul.  British electronic duo Disclosure created a remix of the song entitled "Feel Like I Do".

References

1972 singles
Al Green songs
Songs written by Al Green
Songs written by Willie Mitchell (musician)
Songs written by Al Jackson Jr.
1972 songs
Hi Records singles
Song recordings produced by Willie Mitchell (musician)
Cashbox number-one singles